Trichopsocidae is a family of Psocodea (formerly Psocoptera) belonging to the suborder Psocomorpha. The family includes 11 species in two genera.

Sources 

Lienhard, C. & Smithers, C. N. 2002. Psocoptera (Insecta): World Catalogue and Bibliography. Instrumenta Biodiversitatis, vol. 5. Muséum d'histoire naturelle, Genève.

 
Psocoptera families